Deborah Kay Jones (born 1956) is an American diplomat and the former United States Ambassador to Libya. Prior to her appointment in Libya, she was the United States Ambassador to Kuwait from 2008 to 2011.

Life
She graduated from Brigham Young University, and from National Defense University.

She was married to Richard G. Olson 1990-2019, the former U.S. Special Representative for Afghanistan and Pakistan.

Jones' service as U.S. Ambassador to Libya became non-residential on July 26, 2014, when the Tripoli embassy was closed and diplomatic activities were moved to the U.S. Embassy in Valletta, Malta.

References

External links

|-

1956 births
Ambassadors of the United States to Kuwait
Ambassadors of the United States to Libya
American women ambassadors
Brigham Young University alumni
Living people
Place of birth missing (living people)